Dodirni mi kolena is second album of Belgrade group Zana. Biggest hits are title track, 13 je moj srećan broj, Majstor za poljupce etc. It was released in 1982 under label house Jugoton.

Background 
Songs were completely recorded in Torsby, Sweden during June 1982. Mostly of songs were written by Marina Tucaković. 

In the same year, RTB filmed a video album of the same name, directed by Vladimir Momcilović. 

The album is also accompanied by video for 13 je moj srećan broj and alternative videos for title track and 13 je moj srećan broj.

Track listing

Trivia 
The title song Dodirni mi kolena was covered by Croatian singers Tereza Kesovija as Dance avant de dormir and Severina as Dodirni mi koljena.

References

Jugoton albums
1982 albums